Anlauter is a river of Bavaria, Germany. It flows into the Schwarzach near Kinding.

See also
List of rivers of Bavaria

References

Rivers of Bavaria
Weißenburg-Gunzenhausen
Rivers of Germany